Chirodiscoides caviae is a species of mites belonging to the family Atopomelidae.

The species is found in Europe and America.

References

Sarcoptiformes
Animals described in 1917